The Yale Public School District is located in Yale, Oklahoma, United States. The Yale school district has three schools.

The district is managed by the Superintendent Rocky Kennedy, who works under the direction of a five-person board.

The mascot of both the district and the high school is the Bulldog.

Schools

High school
 Yale High School (Grades 9-12)

Middle school
 Yale Middle School (Grades 6-8)

Elementary school
 Yale Elementary School (Grades PK-5)

References

External links
 

School districts in Oklahoma
Education in Payne County, Oklahoma